Flow may refer to:

Science and technology
 Fluid flow, the motion of a gas or liquid
 Flow (geomorphology), a type of mass wasting or slope movement in geomorphology
 Flow (mathematics), a group action of the real numbers on a set
 Flow (psychology), a mental state of being fully immersed and focused
 Flow, a spacecraft of NASA's GRAIL program

Computing
 Flow network, graph-theoretic version of a mathematical flow
 Flow analysis
 Calligra Flow, free diagramming software 
 Dataflow, a broad concept in computer systems with many different meanings
 Microsoft Flow (renamed to Power Automate in 2019), a workflow toolkit in Microsoft Dynamics
 Neos Flow, a free and open source web application framework written in PHP
 webMethods Flow, a graphical programming language
 FLOW (programming language), an educational programming language from the 1970s
 Flow (web browser), a web browser with a proprietary rendering engine

Arts, entertainment and media
 Flow (journal), an online journal of television and media studies
 Flow (video game)
 Flow (comics), a fictional character in the International Ultramarine Corps
 Flow 93.5, the Canadian radio station CFXJ-FM
 Flow FM (Australia), a radio station

Film and television
 Flow (television), the sequencing of TV material from one element to the next
 Flow TV, a network of Ripe Digital Entertainment
 Flow: For Love of Water, a 2008 documentary film
 Flow (1996 film), a 1996 film by Quentin Lee
 Flow (2014 film), also known as Ækte vare, 2014 film by Fenar Ahmad

Music
 Flow (rapping), the rhythms and rhymes of a hip-hop song's lyrics and how they interact 
 Flow (American band), a new age band
 Flow G, Filipino rapper and songwriter
 Flow (Japanese band), a rock group
 Flow (rapper) (Widner DeGruy, born 1991)
 Flow (Terence Blanchard album), 2005
 Flow (Conception album), 1997
 Flow (Foetus album), 2001
 The Flow, a 1997 album by Chris Leslie
 "Flow", a song by Cage the Elephant from the 2011 album Thank You, Happy Birthday
 "Flow", a song by Sade from the 2000 album Lovers Rock
 "Flow", a song by Transister from the 1998 album Transister

Other uses
 Flow (brand), a Caribbean telecommunications provider
 Flow (policy debate), a form of note-taking in policy debate and public forum debate
 Flow (real estate company), an American residential real estate company
 FLOW (Belgium), a national health care network
 Football League of West Godavari, an Indian football league

See also

 Flo (disambiguation)
 Floe (disambiguation)
 Floh (disambiguation)
 Flou (disambiguation)
 Streamflow, or channel runoff, the flow of water in streams, rivers, and other channels
 Tide, the rise and fall of sea levels 
 Phlow, a German webzine